Rogelio Ramírez de la O is an economist based in Mexico City. He is designated as finance secretary of Mexico, replacing Arturo Herrera Gutiérrez. Director and sole partner of Ecanal S.A., a private company which provides macroeconomic analysis and forecasts on Mexico to business, including some of the largest multinational companies with interests in Mexico. During 2006 he headed on an honorary basis the economic policy team of presidential candidate Andrés Manuel López Obrador, backed by a coalition of parties including the PRD (Party of the Democratic Revolution). Ramírez de la O received a bachelor's degree from the National Autonomous University of Mexico and an Economics PhD from Cambridge University, United Kingdom. He has published works in Mexico, the United States and Europe on NAFTA, Mexico’s macroeconomic problems and the Mexican auto industry, among others. In the frame of the 2012 campaign for presidential elections, Andrés Manuel López Obrador included him as Finance Minister in his cabinet proposal, but the party did not win the elections.

References

External links
Andrés Manuel López Obrador Press Release #70 (in Spanish).
Secretaría de Salud: Rogelio Ramírez de la O (in Spanish).

 

1948 births
Living people
Mexican economists
National Autonomous University of Mexico alumni
Alumni of Fitzwilliam College, Cambridge
21st-century Mexican politicians
Mexican Secretaries of Finance
Morena (political party) politicians
Cabinet of Andrés Manuel López Obrador
People from Mexico City
Politicians from Mexico City